Shankar Dada M.B.B.S. is a 2004 Indian Telugu-language comedy drama film directed by Jayanth C. Paranjee. A remake of the Hindi film Munna Bhai M.B.B.S (2003), the film stars Chiranjeevi,  Sonali Bendre, Srikanth, Girish Karnad, and Paresh Rawal. It received positive reviews and was commercially successful completing 100 days run at the box office.

Chiranjeevi and Srikanth both won the Filmfare Award for Best Actor – Telugu and Filmfare Award for Best Supporting Actor – Telugu awards respectively at South Filmfare Awards in 2005. In 2007, its sequel, Shankar Dada Zindabad was released.

Plot 
Shankar Prasad, nicknamed "Shankar Dada" (literally "Brother Shankar") is a bhai or goonda: a crime don in Hyderabad. Given that his father Satya Prasad had wished him to be a medical doctor, he creates the faux Sri Satya Prasad Charitable Hospital (named after his father) and pretends to live in accordance with this wish whenever his father and mother visit him in Hyderabad.

One day, however, Shankar's plan goes awry when his father meets an old acquaintance, Dr. Ramalingeswara Rao, and the two older men decide to marry Shankar to Ramalingeswara Rao's daughter Dr. Sunitha "Chitti". At this point the truth about Shankar is revealed. Ramalingeswara insults Shankar's parents and calls them "fools" for being ignorant of Shankar's real life. Shankar's parents, aghast and later heartbroken, leave for their village. Shankar, in grief and despair, decides that the only way to redeem himself and to gain revenge for the humiliation suffered by his father at the hands of the spiteful Ramalingeswara is to become a doctor. He decides to go to a medical college to obtain an MBBS degree, the graduate medical degree in South Asia.

With the help of his right-hand man ATM and others, Shankar "gains admission" to the Osmania College of Medical Sciences, where he again encounters Ramalingeswara, who is the dean. His success there becomes dependent upon the (coerced) help of faculty member Dr. Mohammad Rafi. While Shankar's skills as a medical doctor are minimal, he transforms those around him with the "Jantar Mantar" (heartful hug) — a method of comfort taught to Shankar by his mother — and the compassion he shows towards those in need. Despite the school's emphasis on mechanical, Cartesian, impersonal, often bureaucratic relationships between doctors and patients, Shankar constantly seeks to impose a more empathetic, almost holistic, regimen. To this end, he defies all convention by treating a brain-dead child named Sriramachandra Murthy alias Sriram as if the kid were able to perceive and understand normally; interacts on familiar but autocratic terms with patients; humiliates school bullies; effusively thanks a hitherto-underappreciated janitor; and encourages the patients themselves to make changes in their lives, so that they do not need drugs or surgery.

Ramalingeswara, who perceives all this as symptoms of chaos, is unable to prevent it from expanding and gaining ground at his college. He becomes increasingly irrational, almost to the point of insanity. Repeatedly, this near-dementia is shown when he receives unwelcome tidings and begins laughing in a way that implies that he has gone mad. This behavior is explained early on as an attempt to practice laughter therapy, an attempt that seems to have backfired — Ramalingeswara's laughing serves more to convey his anger than diffuse it. Meanwhile, Sunitha becomes increasingly fond of Shankar, who in his turn becomes unreservedly infatuated with her. Some comedy appears here because Shankar is unaware that Sunitha and his childhood friend "Chitti" are one and the same; an ignorance that Sunitha hilariously exploits. Ramalingeswara tries several times to expel Shankar but is often thwarted by Shankar's wit or the affection with which the others at the college regard Shankar, having gained superior self-esteem by his methods.

Eventually, Shankar is shamed into leaving the college: his guilt for not being able to help a dying friend gets the better of him. In the moments immediately following Shankar's departure, Sriram miraculously awakens from his vegetative state; at this point, Sunitha gives a heartfelt speech wherein she criticizes her father for having banished Shankar, saying that to do so is to banish hope, compassion, love, and happiness, etc. from the college. Ramalingeswara eventually realizes his folly. Shankar later marries Sunitha, learning for the first time that she is "Chitti". Finally his parents reconcile, and now, Shankar Prasad is Shankar Dada MBBS.

Cast

Soundtrack

The sound generated at Taramati - Baradri used to be audible to the entire fort of Golkonda because of its strategic location. The producers of Shankar Dada M.B.B.S. obtained special permission to hold this event at such an historical venue. But rain played the spoilt sport and it rained cats and dogs for 3-4 continuous hours in Hyderabad. The organizers changed the venue to Shilpakalavedika, Madapur.

The celebrities who graced this occasion include K Raghavendra Rao, D Rama Naidu, C Aswini Dutt, KL Narayana, KS Rama Rao, Allu Arvind, Vijaya Bapineedu, Shyam Prasad Reddy, C Kalyan, KC Sekhara Babu, Tagore Madhu, Dil Raju, Ashok Kumar, Chanti Affala, Arjuna Raju, Burugapally Sivarama Krishna, VV Vinayak, Seenu Vytla, Satya Murthy, Allu Arjun, Ali, Rohit etc. Raghu Kunche and Bhargavi anchored this event.

Later after the completion of 50 days, two songs "Sande Poddu" (performed by Shankar Mahadevan & Kalpana, written by Sahithi) and "Tellarindo Maava" (performed & written by Devi Sri Prasad) were added to the official track list and The Audio was Re-Released. Both versions were well received.

Awards
Filmfare Awards South

References

External links

2004 films
Telugu remakes of Hindi films
Indian crime comedy-drama films
2000s Telugu-language films
Films scored by Devi Sri Prasad
Medical-themed films
2000s crime comedy-drama films
Films directed by Jayanth C. Paranjee
2004 comedy films
2004 drama films